Fath Ali Kalat (also Romanized as Fatḩ ‘Alī Kalāt; also known as Fatīlāt Kalāt, Faţīlī Kalāt, Qal‘eh Fateh Ali, and Qal‘eh-ye Fatḩ ‘Alī) is a village in Pir Sohrab Rural District, in the Central District of Chabahar County, Sistan and Baluchestan Province, Iran. At the 2006 census, its population was 299, in 43 families.

References 

Populated places in Chabahar County